Metallization pressure is the pressure required for a non-metallic chemical element to become a metal. Every material is predicted to turn into a metal if the pressure is high enough, and temperature low enough. Neon has the highest metallization pressure for any element.

The value for arsenic refers to pressurizing metastable black arsenic; grey arsenic, the standard state, is already a metallic conductor at standard conditions.

The metallization pressures for fluorine and radon have never been experimentally measured. For fluorine, 2020 calculations predict metallization at 25 Mbar.

See also
Metallic hydrogen

References

Physical chemistry
Allotropes